Aleksandar Šoštar (born 21 January 1964) is a Serbian water polo goalkeeper who played on the bronze medal squad of FR Yugoslavia at the 2000 Summer Olympics and on the gold medal squad for SFR Yugoslavia at the 1988 Summer Olympics.

In 2001 he was declared for Athlete of the Year and Sportsman of the Year in Yugoslavia.

He currently performs the functions of the President Water Polo Club Partizan and President of the Sports Federation of Serbia.

Early life
Šoštar was born in Niš to Croatian father Stjepan Šoštar and Serbian mother. His father who hails from the town of Ivanec moved to Belgrade during the late 1950s as an employee of the Yugoslav People's Army (JNA) where he remained living after marrying a woman from Niš and starting a family. Though the family lived in Belgrade, Aleksandar was born in Niš due to his mother visiting her relatives at the time.

Club career

Clubs
  Partizan (1981–1992)
  Posillipo (1992–1994)
  Budvanska Rivijera (1994)
  Barcelona (1994–1996)
  Budvanska Rivijera (1996–1997) 2x
  NIS Naftagas-Bečej (1997–2001)
  FTC-VMAX (2001–2002)

See also
 Yugoslavia men's Olympic water polo team records and statistics
 Serbia and Montenegro men's Olympic water polo team records and statistics
 List of Olympic champions in men's water polo
 List of Olympic medalists in water polo (men)
 List of men's Olympic water polo tournament goalkeepers
 List of world champions in men's water polo
 List of World Aquatics Championships medalists in water polo
 List of members of the International Swimming Hall of Fame

References

External links

 

1964 births
Living people
Sportspeople from Niš
Serbian male water polo players
Yugoslav male water polo players
Water polo goalkeepers
Water polo players at the 1988 Summer Olympics
Water polo players at the 1996 Summer Olympics
Water polo players at the 2000 Summer Olympics
Olympic water polo players of Yugoslavia
Olympic gold medalists for Yugoslavia
Olympic bronze medalists for Federal Republic of Yugoslavia
Olympic medalists in water polo
European champions for Serbia and Montenegro
Medalists at the 2000 Summer Olympics
Medalists at the 1988 Summer Olympics
World Aquatics Championships medalists in water polo
Mediterranean Games silver medalists for Yugoslavia
Competitors at the 1991 Mediterranean Games
Mediterranean Games medalists in water polo
Serbian people of Croatian descent